The Whitecourt Wolverines are a junior "A" ice hockey team in North Division of the Alberta Junior Hockey League (AJHL) based in Whitecourt, Alberta, Canada. The 2012–13 season was their inaugural season in Whitecourt.

The Wolverines were founded on May 2, 2012, through the relocation of the St. Albert Steel from St. Albert. The team plays out of the Scott Safety Centre, which has a seating capacity of 1,058. Scott Safety Supply Services Ltd. is the sponsor of the arena and a corporate sponsor of the team.

History 
The Whitecourt Wolverines junior "A" franchise was originally established for the 1976–77 season as the Fort Saskatchewan Traders. The Traders won their first AJHL championship in 1978–79, their third year in the league. After winning the championship, the team then defeated the Richmond Sockeyes of the British Columbia Junior Hockey League (BCJHL) in five games at the Doyle Cup, before falling to the Prince Albert Raiders in six games at the Abbott Cup, the eventual national champions at the 1979 Centennial Cup. The Traders won their second league championship in 1983–84.

Due in part to financial difficulties and low attendance, the AJHL approved a deal on March 15, 2007, to relocate the Traders to St. Albert for the 2007–08 season, ending the Traders' 31-year run in Fort Saskatchewan. The team was renamed the St. Albert Steel, and became the second AJHL team to represent the city of St. Albert, replacing the St. Albert Saints who left for Spruce Grove in 2004.

After five years in St. Albert, it was announced on March 29, 2012, that the team applied to relocate to Whitecourt for the 2012–13 season. On May 2, 2012, the move was approved and the team would remain in the AJHL's North Division as the Whitecourt Wolverines.

The twice relocated franchise took its team name from the then-current junior "B" Whitecourt Wolverines of the North West Junior Hockey League (NWJHL). After five years in the NWJHL, four league championships, a provincial title, and a bronze medal at the Keystone Cup, this junior "B" predecessor team folded to make way for the relocated junior "A" Wolverines.

The Jr. A Wolverines played their first game September 14, 2012, in a 4–2 loss to the Canmore Eagles on the road, with Colton Meaver scoring the Wolverines' first goal. The team would win their first game the next day against the Okotoks Oilers in overtime. Their first home had an over-capacity attendance of 1,283 on September 21. By the end of October, the team had an 11–7–1 record and was ranked 14th in the national Junior A rankings by the Canadian Junior Hockey League. The team made the playoffs at the end of their first season with a fourth place finish in the division. The Wolverines then advanced to the division finals where they lost to the Spruce Grove Saints.

Wolverines' Mathieu Guertin and Colten Mayor each won the Ernie Love Trophy, awarded annually to the AJHL's scoring champion, in the team's first two seasons, respectively. Guertin accumulated 95 points in the inaugural 2012–13 season, while Mayor was the co-winner in the sophomore 2013–14 season, tying Spencer Dorowicz of the Olds Grizzlys with 75 points.       Cameron Johnson is in the Whitecourt wolverines junior league same with Clover good Rioch

Season-by-season record 
For previous teams' records, see Fort Saskatchewan Traders and St. Albert Steel.

Note: GP = games played, W = wins, L = losses, OTL = overtime losses, Pts = points, GF = goals for, GA = goals against, PIM = penalties in minutes

Personnel

Team captains
Jamie Johnson (2012)
Jerome Raymond (2012–2013)
Trace Elson (2013)
Colten Mayor (2013–2014)
Evan Warmington (2014)
Ryan Grant (2017–2018)

Head coaches
Joey Bouchard (2012–2016)
Gord Thibodeau (2016–2019)
Shawn Martin (2019–present)

General managers
Joey Bouchard (2012–2016)
Gord Thibodeau (2016–2019)
Shawn Martin (2019–present)

Team presidents
Brent Stark (2012–present)

Honoured members 
The number 22 was retired for Elias Lachance at the start of the 2011–12 season. Lachance, who played for the Wolverines' predecessor junior "B" hockey team during its 2008–09 and 2009–10 seasons, died in a car accident in 2011.

Community 
The Wolverines are engaged in two programs within the community under a "Team for Success" project where players mentor young students on reading and writing, and boys through issues experienced at the junior high level. During their inaugural season, the team hosted a Hockey Hall of Fame exhibit that featured the Stanley Cup. The proceeds from the event, sponsored by Scott Safety, benefitted the Whitecourt Minor Hockey Association and the Whitecourt Girl Guides.

See also 
 List of ice hockey teams in Alberta

References

External links 
Whitecourt Wolverines

Alberta Junior Hockey League teams
Ice hockey teams in Alberta
Ice hockey clubs established in 2012
Whitecourt
2012 establishments in Alberta